The 2022 Las Vegas Aces season was the franchise's 26th season in the Women's National Basketball Association and the 5th year the franchise is based in Las Vegas - after relocating from San Antonio and Utah. The regular season began on May 6, 2022, at the Phoenix Mercury.

On December 31, 2021, the Aces named former WNBA great and San Antonio Spurs assistant coach Becky Hammon as their new head coach.

The Aces started the season under Hammon in strong fashion, winning their first two games before losing a game.  The team then went on a seven game winning streak to end May 9–1.  The winning streak ended on the first of June, but the Aces then won their next four straight games.  The end of June was not as kind to the team, as they lost three of their last four games, to finish the month 5–4.  July got off to a rocky start, with the team losing two of its first three games, but then they won three of their next four before finishing the month on a four game winning streak.  The winning streak would be five if you include the Commissioner's Cup Final.  The Aces beat the Chicago Sky 93–83 to win their first Commissioners Cup.  Excluding that cup, the team finished July 8–3, and secured a birth into the 2022 WNBA Playoffs on July 24th.  The started the final month of the season on a two game losing streak, but won their last four games to finish the month 4–2 and secure the first seed in the playoffs.  Their win in the penultimate game of the season gave them the better head-to-head record with Chicago and secured the tiebreaker for the top seed.  Their final record of 26–10 in the regular season, was the highest win total in franchise history and their winning percentage of .722 was the second highest.

As the first seed in the Playoffs, they had home court advantage against the eight seed Phoenix Mercury in the First Round.  The Aces won the first game 79–63 and cruise to a game two victory 117–80 to win the series two games to zero.  In the Second Round they faced off against the fourth seeded Seattle Storm.  Las Vegas lost the first game at home 73–76.  However, they won game two 78–73 to send the series to Seattle tied.  The Aces prevailed in over time in game three of the series and also won game four in Seattle to take the series three games to one.  The Aces would again have home court advantage in the WNBA Finals where they matched up against the third seed Connecticut Sun.  Las Vegas won the first two games at home 67–64 and 85–71 respectively.  The Aces lost game three in Connecticut 76–105.  However, they game back and won game four to win the series three games to one and finish as WNBA Champions.  This was the first championship in franchise history.

During the postseason, A'ja Wilson was named MVP, Jackie Young won Most Improved Player, Chelsea Gray was Finals MVP, and Coach Becky Hammon was named Coach of the Year in her first season.

Transactions

WNBA Draft

Trades and Roster Changes

Roster

Schedule

Preseason

|- style="background:#fcc;"
| 1
| May 1
| @ Minnesota
| L 86–89
| Kelsey Plum (16)
| A'ja Wilson (7)
| Kelsey Plum (5)
| Target CenterN/A
| 0–1

Regular Season

|- style="background:#cfc;"
| 1
| May 6
| @ Phoenix
| W 106–88
| Dearica Hamby (24)
| A'ja Wilson (11)
| Kelsey Plum (7)
| Footprint Center7,167
| 1–0
|- style="background:#cfc;"
| 2
| May 8
| Seattle
| W 85–74
| A'ja Wilson (20)
| Dearica Hamby (19)
| Kelsey Plum (7)
| Michelob Ultra Arena6,212
| 2–0
|- style="background:#fcc;"
| 3
| May 10
| @ Washington
| L 76–89
| Jackie Young (19)
| A'ja Wilson (11)
| Chelsea Gray (5)
| Entertainment and Sports Arena3,082
| 2–1
|- style="background:#cfc;"
| 4
| May 13
| @ Atlanta
| W 96–73
| A'ja Wilson (15)
| Dearica Hamby (13)
| Kelsey Plum (11)
| Gateway Center Arena3,138
| 3–1
|- style="background:#cfc;"
| 5
| May 17
| Phoenix
| W 86–74
| Kelsey Plum (20)
| A'ja Wilson (10)
| Chelsea Gray (9)
| Michelob Ultra Arena2,536
| 4–1
|- style="background:#cfc;"
| 6
| May 19
| Minnesota
| W 93–87
| Jackie Young (25)
| Dearica Hamby (12)
| Chelsea Gray (7)
| Michelob Ultra Arena3,640
| 5–1
|- style="background:#cfc;"
| 7
| May 21
| Phoenix
| W 100–80
| Kelsey Plum (24)
| Theresa Plaisance (9)
| GrayYoung (5)
| Michelob Ultra Arena5,572
| 6–1
|- style="background:#cfc;"
| 8
| May 23
| Los Angeles
| W 104–76
| A'ja Wilson (24)
| Jackie Young (9)
| Kelsey Plum (8)
| Michelob Ultra Arena4,092
| 7–1
|- style="background:#cfc;"
| 9
| May 28
| @ Chicago
| W 83–76
| A'ja Wilson (22)
| A'ja Wilson (16)
| GrayPlumYoung (6)
| Wintrust Arena6,812
| 8–1
|- style="background:#cfc;"
| 10
| May 31
| Connecticut
| W 89–81
| A'ja Wilson (24)
| A'ja Wilson (14)
| Kelsey Plum (7)
| Michelob Ultra Arena4,693
| 9–1
|-

|- style="background:#fcc;"
| 11
| June 2
| Connecticut
| L 90–97
| Jackie Young (26)
| HambyWilson (7)
| Kelsey Plum (8)
| Michelob Ultra Arena3,801
| 9–2
|- style="background:#cfc;"
| 12
| June 5
| Dallas
| W 84–78
| Kelsey Plum (32)
| Dearica Hamby (8)
| HambyPlum (5)
| Michelob Ultra Arena4,814
| 10–2
|- style="background:#cfc;"
| 13
| June 11
| @ Los Angeles
| W 89–72
| A'ja Wilson (35)
| A'ja Wilson (11)
| Kelsey Plum (8)
| Crypto.com Arena8,200
| 11–2
|- style="background:#cfc;"
| 14
| June 15
| @ Dallas
| W 92–84
| Kelsey Plum (27)
| Dearica Hamby (12)
| Chelsea Gray (8)
| College Park Center4,375
| 12–2
|- style="background:#cfc;"
| 15
| June 19
| Minnesota
| W 96–95
| A'ja Wilson (25)
| A'ja Wilson (8)
| Chelsea Gray (8)
| Michelob Ultra Arena4,603
| 13–2
|- style="background:#fcc;"
| 16
| June 21
| Chicago
| L 95–104
| Jackie Young (23)
| A'ja Wilson (11)
| GrayPlum (7)
| Michelob Ultra Arena4,951
| 13–3
|- style="background:#fcc;"
| 17
| June 25
| Washington
| L 86–87 (OT)
| PlumYoung (20)
| A'ja Wilson (14)
| Chelsea Gray (6)
| Michelob Ultra Arena7,171
| 13–4
|- style="background:#cfc;"
| 18
| June 27
| @ Los Angeles
| W 79–73
| Kelsey Plum (29)
| A'ja Wilson (11)
| Jackie Young (7)
| Crypto.com Arena4,200
| 14–4
|- style="background:#fcc;"
| 19
| June 29
| @ Seattle
| L 78–88
| A'ja Wilson (17)
| A'ja Wilson (16)
| Chelsea Gray (8)
| Climate Pledge Arena9,499
| 14–5
|-

|- style="background:#cfc;"
| 20
| July 1
| @ Minnesota
| W 91–85
| Chelsea Gray (21)
| A'ja Wilson (12)
| Kelsey Plum (10)
| Target Center6,104
| 15–5
|- style="background:#fcc;"
| 21
| July 3
| @ Minnesota
| L 71–102
| Kelsey Plum (12)
| A'ja Wilson (7)
| Kelsey Plum (5)
| Target Center7,603
| 15–6
|- style="background:#fcc;"
| 22
| July 6
| New York
| L 107–116
| A'ja Wilson (29)
| A'ja Wilson (9)
| Chelsea Gray (6)
| Michelob Ultra Arena8,405
| 15–7
|- style="background:#cfc;"
| 23
| July 12
| @ New York
| W 107–101
| Kelsey Plum (27)
| A'ja Wilson (14)
| Jackie Young (7)
| Barclays Center5,201
| 16–7
|- style="background:#cfc;"
| 24
| July 14
| @ New York
| W 108–74
| A'ja Wilson (25)
| Dearica Hamby (7)
| Jackie Young (9)
| Barclays Center9,896
| 17–7
|- style="background:#cfc;"
| 25
| July 17
| @ Connecticut
| W 91–83
| Kelsey Plum (22)
| HambyWilson (7)
| Chelsea Gray (9)
| Mohegan Sun Arena6,814
| 18–7
|- style="background:#fcc;"
| 26
| July 19
| Atlanta
| L 76–92
| A'ja Wilson (22)
| A'ja Wilson (10)
| Kelsey Plum (7)
| Michelob Ultra Arena5,952
| 18–8
|- style="background:#cfc;"
| 27
| July 21
| Indiana
| W 90–77
| A'ja Wilson (23)
| Dearica Hamby (9)
| Chelsea Gray (12)
| Michelob Ultra Arena5,737
| 19–8
|- style="background:#cfc;"
| 28
| July 23
| Los Angeles
| W 84–66
| Kelsey Plum (29)
| Jackie Young (9)
| Jackie Young (6)
| Michelob Ultra Arena7,522
| 20–8
|-
| CC Final
| July 26
| @ Chicago
| W 93–83
| Kelsey Plum (24)
| A'ja Wilson (17)
| Kelsey Plum (6)
| Wintrust Arena8,922
| N/A
|- style="background:#cfc;"
| 29
| July 29
| @ Indiana
| W 93–72
| PlumWilson (22)
| Jackie Young (7)
| GrayYoung (5)
| Hinkle Fieldhouse1,828
| 21–8
|- style="background:#cfc;"
| 30
| July 31
| @ Indiana
| W 94–69
| Kelsey Plum (26)
| Kiah Stokes (10)
| Chelsea Gray (7)
| Hinkle Fieldhouse1,822
| 22–8
|-

|- style="background:#fcc;"
| 31
| August 2
| @ Washington
| L 73–83
| A'ja Wilson (22)
| A'ja Wilson (12)
| Kelsey Plum (5)
| Entertainment and Sports Arena4,200
| 22–9
|- style="background:#fcc;"
| 32
| August 4
| @ Dallas
| L 80–82
| Chelsea Gray (28)
| A'ja Wilson (9)
| Kelsey Plum (7)
| College Park Center3,492
| 22–10
|- style="background:#cfc;"
| 33
| August 7
| @ Seattle
| W 89–81
| A'ja Wilson (29)
| Kiah Stokes (9)
| Chelsea Gray (9)
| Climate Pledge Arena18,100
| 23–10
|- style="background:#cfc;"
| 34
| August 9
| Atlanta
| W 97–90
| A'ja Wilson (24)
| A'ja Wilson (14)
| Kelsey Plum (8)
| Michelob Ultra Arena5,151
| 24–10
|- style="background:#cfc;"
| 35
| August 11
| Chicago
| W 89–78
| Kelsey Plum (25)
| Kiah Stokes (7)
| Kelsey Plum (5)
| Michelob Ultra Arena6,055
| 25–10
|- style="background:#cfc;"
| 36
| August 14
| Seattle
| W 109–100
| Chelsea Gray (33)
| A'ja Wilson (10)
| Chelsea Gray (9)
| Michelob Ultra Arena10,015
| 26–10
|-

Playoffs 

|- style="background:#cfc;"
| 1
| August 18
| Phoenix
| W 79–63
| Kelsey Plum (22)
| Kiah Stokes (13)
| GrayPlum (4)
| Michelob Ultra Arena8,725
| 1–0
|- style="background:#cfc;"
| 2
| August 21
| Phoenix
| W 117–80
| Chelsea Gray (27)
| Riquna Williams (5)
| Chelsea Gray (8)
| Michelob Ultra Arena9,126
| 2–0
|-

|- style="background:#fcc;"
| 1
| August 28
| Seattle
| L 73–76
| Chelsea Gray (21)
| A'ja Wilson (12)
| GrayYoung (5)
| Michelob Ultra Arena9,944
| 0–1
|- style="background:#cfc;"
| 2
| August 31
| Seattle
| W 78–73
| A'ja Wilson (33)
| A'ja Wilson (13)
| Chelsea Gray (7)
| Michelob Ultra Arena9,755
| 1–1
|- style="background:#cfc;"
| 3
| September 4
| @ Seattle
| W 110–98 (OT)
| A'ja Wilson (34)
| Kiah Stokes (12)
| Chelsea Gray (12)
| Climate Pledge Arena15,431
| 2–1
|- style="background:#cfc;"
| 4
| September 6
| @ Seattle
| W 97–92
| Chelsea Gray (31)
| A'ja Wilson (13)
| Chelsea Gray (10)
| Climate Pledge Arena11,328
| 3–1
|-

|- style="background:#cfc;"
| 1
| September 11
| Connecticut
| W 67–64
| A'ja Wilson (24)
| A'ja Wilson (11)
| Chelsea Gray (3)
| Michelob Ultra Arena10,135
| 1–0
|- style="background:#cfc;"
| 2
| September 13
| Connecticut
| W 85–71
| A'ja Wilson (26)
| A'ja Wilson (10)
| Chelsea Gray (8)
| Michelob Ultra Arena10,211
| 2–0
|- style="background:#fcc;"
| 3
| September 15
| @ Connecticut
| L 76–105
| Jackie Young (22)
| Kiah Stokes (7)
| Chelsea Gray (7)
| Mohegan Sun Arena8,745
| 2–1
|- style="background:#cfc;"
| 4
| September 18
| @ Connecticut
| W 78–71
| Chelsea Gray (20)
| A'ja Wilson (14)
| Jackie Young (8)
| Mohegan Sun Arena9,652
| 3–1
|-

Standings

Playoffs

Statistics

Regular Season

‡Waived/Released during the season
†Traded during the season
≠Acquired during the season

Playoffs

Awards and Honors

References

External links 
 Official website of the Las Vegas Aces

Las Vegas Aces
Las Vegas Aces seasons
Women's National Basketball Association championship seasons
Las Vegas Aces